Ferdinand Maria (31 October 1636 – 26 May 1679) was a Wittelsbach ruler of Bavaria and an elector (Kurfürst) of the Holy Roman Empire from 1651 to 1679.

Electoral Prince of Bavaria
He was born in Munich. He was the eldest son of Maximilian I, Elector of Bavaria (whom he succeeded), and his second wife, Maria Anna of Austria, daughter of the emperor Ferdinand II, Holy Roman Emperor.

Born during the reign of his father, he was known as the Electoral Prince from birth. Through his mother, he was a first cousin of Queen Mariana of Spain as well as Leopold I, Holy Roman Emperor.

On 8 December 1650, he married Henriette Adelaide of Savoy, daughter of Victor Amadeus I, Duke of Savoy and Christine Marie of France. The couple had seven children, only two of whom would have offspring.

Elector
Still a minor when he succeeded his father in 1651, his mother became his guardian and his uncle, Albert VI of Bavaria served as Prince Administrator of Bavaria for three years.

Ferdinand Maria was crowned on 31 October 1654. His absolutistic style of leadership became a benchmark for the rest of Germany. Though Ferdinand Maria allied with France, he abstained from the imperial crown in 1657 after the death of his uncle Ferdinand III, Holy Roman Emperor to avoid conflict with the House of Habsburg. Ferdinand Maria supported the wars of the Habsburg against the Ottoman Empire with Bavarian auxiliary forces (1662–1664). Under his leadership, Bavaria was officially neutral during the Franco-Dutch War (1672–1678). Plans for a Bavarian colony near New York were discussed but soon abandoned.

The marriage of his eldest daughter Maria Anna Victoria and her cousin le Grand Dauphin in 1680 was the outcome of the Bavarian alliance with France. Ferdinand Maria was the great grandfather of French monarch King Louis XV.

Ferdinand Maria modernized the Bavarian army and introduced the first Bavarian local government code. The elector did much indeed to repair the wounds caused by the Thirty Years' War, encouraging agriculture and industries, and building or restoring numerous churches and monasteries. In 1669, moreover, he again called a meeting of the diet, which had been suspended since 1612. The electorate he left with a very wealthy treasury.

He died at the Old Schleissheim Palace and was succeeded by his son Maximilian II Emanuel. He was buried in the crypt of the Theatiner Church in Munich.

Cultural legacy
 
Ferdinand Maria married Princess Henriette Adelaide of Savoy in 1650; and with her, the Italian Baroque was introduced in Bavaria.

The Theatiner Church in Munich was built from 1663 onwards as a gesture of thanks for the birth of the long-awaited heir to the Bavarian crown, Prince Maximilian II Emanuel. After that in 1664, Ferdinand Maria and his wife commissioned the building of the Baroque style Nymphenburg Palace near Munich based on the designs of Italian architect Agostino Barelli.

Lake Starnberg was purchased by Ferdinand Maria from the Horwarth family and it became the venue of numerous festivities of the court with the famous fleet of Venetian Gondolas. On the lake's shores, he ordered the construction of Berg Castle in 1676.

The castle was used for festivities there and later reached its zenith when it became the scene of spectacular entertainments and hunts under the rule of his successors, Maximilian Emanuel and Emperor Charles VII. For the Munich Residenz, Ferdinand Maria ordered the creation of the Papal Rooms.

Issue

 Maria Anna Victoria of Bavaria (28 November 1660 – 20 April 1690) married Louis, Dauphin of France, and had issue.
 Maximilian II Emanuel, Elector of Bavaria (11 July 1662 – 26 February 1726); married Maria Antonia of Austria and had issue; married Theresa Kunegunda Sobieska and had issue.
 Luise Margarete Antonie of Bavaria (18 September 1663 – 10 November 1665) died in infancy.
 Ludwig Amadeus Victor of Bavaria (6 April 1665 – 11 December 1665) died in infancy.
 Stillborn son (4 August 1666).
 Kajetan Maria Franz of Bavaria (2 May 1670 – 7 December 1670) died in infancy.
 Joseph Clemens of Bavaria (5 December 1671 – 12 November 1723) Elector and Archbishop of Cologne died unmarried.
 Violante Beatrix of Bavaria (3 April 1673 – 3 June 1731) married Ferdinando de' Medici, Grand Prince of Tuscany and died childless.

In addition, the Electress suffered three miscarriages: in June 1661, March 1664 and 1674.

Ancestors

References

1636 births
1679 deaths
17th-century prince-electors of Bavaria
Nobility from Munich
House of Wittelsbach
Modern child monarchs
Burials at the Theatine Church, Munich
Imperial vicars